Neodrymonia apicalis is a moth of the family Notodontidae first described by Frederic Moore in 1879.

Distribution
It is found in China, Vietnam, India and in Nepal.

References

Notodontidae